The Kumquat Festival is an annual celebration held in late January in Dade City, Florida focused on the kumquat, a small tart citrus fruit usually eaten whole, with the skin on, and used in marmalades and desserts.  It is organized by the Dade City Chamber of Commerce. The festival brings tens of thousands of visitors and is in its 24th year as of 2021. The crop can be damaged by freezes.

Nearby St. Joseph, Florida is known as the kumquat capital of the world, according to Kumquat Festival brochures.

2021 sees this festival move to March, plus strict measures, like social distancing & wearing masks.

References

External links
Kumquat Festival Kumquat Growers Inc.

Food and drink festivals in the United States
Festivals in Florida
Dade City, Florida
Fruit festivals
1998 establishments in Florida
Kumquats
Citrus industry in Florida